OpenEdition may refer to:

 OpenEdition MVS, the original name of UNIX System Services
 OpenEdition Shell and Utilities Feature for VM/ESA, the original name of z/VM OpenExtensions Shell and Utilities
 OpenEdition.org, a scholarly Web portal